Fred Miller (1873–?) was a Welsh international rugby union forward who played club rugby for Mountain Ash; and was the first player to represent an international team whilst at the club when he was selected for Wales in 1896. Miller later 'Went North', joining professional rugby league team Hull F.C.

Miller was a collier by trade, working at Nixon's Navigation Colliery in Mountain Ash, and was described as a stalwart specimen of the Welsh collier.

Rugby career
Miller was first selected to play for Wales while representing Mountain Ash at club level. He was chosen for the final game of the 1896 Home Nations Championship, against Ireland; one of only two new caps to be brought into the Welsh team along with Llewellyn Lloyd. Wales lost the game due to the Irish overcoming the Welsh kick-and-rush tactics employed by the forwards, and the next game Miller was replaced by Jack Rhapps.

Miller found himself out of favour with the Welsh selectors until he was recalled four years later for the 1900 Championship replacing Llanelli's David Daniel. This was the beginning of the First Golden Age of Welsh rugby, and Miller was part of the team that won all three of the 1900 Championship games to lift the Triple Crown. Miller played in all three matches, and did enough to secure his reselection for the entire 1901 Home Nations Championship. Wales won the opener against England and the final game to Ireland, but were outclassed against Scotland at Inverleith. Miller was replaced in the 1902 tournament by Arthur Harding.

International matches played
Wales
 1900, 1901
 1900, 1901
 1896, 1900, 1901

Bibliography

References 

1873 births
Hull F.C. players
Mountain Ash RFC players
Rugby league players from Powys
Rugby union forwards
Rugby union players from Powys
Wales international rugby union players
Welsh miners
Welsh rugby league players
Welsh rugby union players
Year of death missing